LanC like 1 is a protein that in humans is encoded by the LANCL1 gene.

Function

This gene encodes a loosely associated peripheral membrane protein related to the LanC family of bacterial membrane-associated proteins involved in the biosynthesis of antimicrobial peptides. This protein may play a role as a peptide-modifying enzyme component in eukaryotic cells. Previously considered a member of the G-protein-coupled receptor superfamily, this protein is now in the LanC family. Multiple alternatively spliced variants, encoding the same protein, have been identified.

References

Further reading